The 2022 European Speed Skating Championships was held between 7 and 9 January 2022, at the Thialf in Heerenveen, Netherlands.

Schedule 
All times are local (UTC+1).

Medal summary

Medal table

Men's events

Women's events

References

External links
Results

2022
 
2022 in Dutch sport
2022 in speed skating
Sports competitions in Heerenveen
International speed skating competitions hosted by the Netherlands
January 2022 sports events in the Netherlands